The 1998 season of the Ukrainian Championship was the 7th season of Ukraine's women's football competitions. The championship ran from 24 April 1998 to 8 July 1998.

The championship was played as a sextuple round-robin tournament compered to the last year quadruple round-robin.

Teams

Team changes

Name changes
 Donchanka Donetsk, last season was known as Donchanka-Varna Donetsk
 Lvivianka Lviv, last competed in the 1993 Persha Liha, but Harmoniya played in the 1995 Vyshcha Liha

Higher League

League table

References

External links
WFPL.ua
Women's Football.ua

1997
1997–98 in Ukrainian association football leagues
1998–99 in Ukrainian association football leagues
Ukrainian Women's League
Ukrainian Women's League